St Philomena College, Puttur is an educational institution for UG and PG studies situated in Puttur town in Karnataka state, India. The college is being managed by The Catholic Board of Education(CBE) of the Diocese of Mangalore.

The College has been accredited with "A" Grade by National Assessment and Accreditation Council (NAAC) based on its infrastructure, learning resources and achievements.

History

Saint Philomena College was established by Msgr Antony Patrao in 1958.

Academics

The college is providing 3 years bachelor's degree in field of Arts, Science and Commerce with English as a mandatory language. It is affiliated with Mangalore University.

References

External links
 St Philomena College Official Website

Colleges of Mangalore University
Universities and colleges in Dakshina Kannada district